The term chronophilia was used by psychologist John Money to describe a form of paraphilia in which an individual experiences sexual fixation limited to individuals of particular age ranges.  The term has not been widely adopted by sexologists, who instead use terms that refer to the specific age range in question. An arguable historical precursor was Richard von Krafft-Ebing's concept of "age fetishism".

Sexual preferences based on age
Sexual fixation on minors
Pedohebephilia refers to an expansion and reclassification of pedophilia and hebephilia with subgroups, proposed during the development of the DSM-5. It refers more broadly to sexual fixations. Under the proposed revisions, people who are dysfunctional as a result of it would be diagnosed with pedohebephilic disorder. People would be broken down into types based on the idea of being fixated on one, the other or both of the subgroups. The proposed revision was not ratified for inclusion in the final published version of DSM-5.
Infantophilia (sometimes called nepiophilia) is a subtype of pedophilia describing a sexual fixation on children less than 5 years old (including toddlers and infants).
Pedophilia is a psychological disorder in which an adult or older adolescent experiences a sexual fixation on prepubescent youth. According to the fifth edition of the Diagnostic and Statistical Manual of Mental Disorders (DSM-5), pedophilia is a paraphilia in which a person has intense sexual urges towards children, and experiences recurrent sexual urges towards and fantasies about children.  Pedophilic disorder is further defined as psychological disorder in which a person meets the criteria for pedophilia above, and also either acts upon those urges, or else experiences distress or interpersonal difficulty as a consequence.  The diagnosis can be made under the DSM or ICD criteria for persons age 16 and older.
Fixation on adolescents
Hebephilia and ephebophilia are sexual fixations on pubescent and post-pubescent youths, respectively.  The term hebephilia was introduced by Bernard Glueck in 1955.
Attraction to adults
Teleiophilia (from Greek téleios, "full grown") is a sexual preference for adults. The term was coined by Ray Blanchard in 2000 and has seen less public adoption than some newer terms.
Mesophilia (derived from the Greek "mesos", "intermediate") is a sexual preference for middle-aged adults. The term was coined by Michael Seto in 2016.
Gerontophilia is a sexual preference for the elderly.

See also
Age disparity in sexual relationships
List of paraphilias
MILF (slang)

References